Jonathan Mendelsohn (born 19 June 1980) is an American singer and songwriter. He has worked with EDM DJs such as Hardwell, Brennan Heart and Blasterjaxx. Their collaborations "We Are Legends", "Imaginary" and "Ghost In The Machine" held the number one position on the respective Beatport Top 100, while the song "Till Tonight" with Laidback Luke was ranked in the dutch national charts. Also two tracks with Dash Berlin received a nomination for 'Best Trance Track' at the IDMA's.

Early life 
Mendelsohn was born in Brooklyn, New York City, and raised in Upstate New York. At the age of eleven he began writing his own songs after having learnt chord progression from his concert pianist mother. He names Mariah Carey and Björk as an early influence, before getting in touch with electronic music during highschool. In 2007 he won the 'Amateur Night competition' at the Apollo Theater, which caught the attention of Chris Brann and led to a record deal with Sony BMG. Mendelsohn was also noticed by Nic Chagall and later Dash Berlin.

Career in electronic dance music 
In 2013, Mendelsohn did the vocals for the song "Imaginary" by Brennan Heart. It was part of the Defqon.1 endshow and got released on Brennan Heart's album "Evolution of Style". The song held the number one position on the Hard Dance Beatport Charts and was ranked in the Top 100 for 777 days. It was voted as best hardstyle track of the year by Q-dance. In 2019, "Imaginary" was certified gold in the Netherlands.

In 2015 Mendelsohn was featured in Hardwell's album "United We Are" with the collaboration "Echo". It was released as a single later that year and was ranked #1 on the dutch iTunes charts and #2 worldwide.

Starting 2017 Mendelsohn worked together with Swedish producer Kaaze. Their collaboration with Hardwell "We Are Legends" was released on the Hardwell & Friends EP Vol.1 and was ranked #1 in the Bigroom Beatport Charts. Two more collaborations followed on Revealed Recordings in 2017 and 2019.

Discography

References

External links
 Jonathan Mendelsohn on Discogs

1980 births
Living people
American electronic musicians
American male singer-songwriters
American dance musicians
Musicians from Brooklyn
Singer-songwriters from New York (state)
21st-century American singers
21st-century American male singers